WTVH (channel 5) is a television station in Syracuse, New York, United States, affiliated with CBS. It is the only station whose broadcast license continues to be owned by Granite Broadcasting, a moribund company (controlled by Greenwich, Connecticut–based hedge fund Silver Point Capital) that sold most of its remaining assets in 2014 and 2017. Granite maintains a local marketing agreement (LMA) with Sinclair Broadcast Group, owner of dual NBC/CW affiliate WSTM-TV (channel 3), for the provision of certain services. Both stations share studios on James Street/NY 290 in the Near Northeast section of Syracuse, while WTVH's transmitter is located in the town of Onondaga.

History
The station debuted on December 1, 1948, as WHEN-TV airing an analog signal on VHF channel 8. It went on-the-air as Syracuse's first television station. The channel was the first station owned and operated by the Meredith Corporation and was the 47th station to launch in the United States. Meredith simultaneously entered the television field in several Midwestern cities including Omaha and Kansas City. In 1954, it purchased WAGE radio (620 AM) and changed that station's call letters to WHEN (AM); it also switched the station's network affiliation to CBS Radio in 1956 matching it with other Meredith-owned outlets.

The station became a primary CBS affiliate on January 1, 1949, and also carried secondary affiliations with NBC, ABC, and DuMont. When the original WSYR-TV (now WSTM-TV) signed-on in 1950 and took the NBC affiliation, WHEN-TV shared ABC with that channel until WNYS-TV (channel 9, later WIXT-TV and now the present WSYR-TV) signed-on in 1962 and took the ABC affiliation. The affiliation with DuMont ended in 1956 when that network ceased operations. It is the oldest continuing affiliate of the CBS Television Network among stations not owned by the network itself.

In July 1961, WHEN-TV moved to channel 5, swapping channel locations with WROC-TV in Rochester as the Federal Communications Commission (FCC) revised its Upstate New York allocation table to provide more VHF service in the two cities. In 1963, the WHEN stations moved from their original Court Street studios into a new state-of-the-art facility on James Street near WSYR (AM)-FM-TV's studios. Popular national radio and television personality Arthur Godfrey originated his late-morning CBS network radio show from the new WHEN studios on the day the facility opened to help Meredith celebrate.

In 1976, the company sold WHEN radio to Park Communications but retained WHEN-TV. Since the radio station kept the WHEN call letters, Meredith had to change channel 5's call sign. It originally wanted the new call letters WTVF ("Television Five", referring to the station's on-air identity) but those had already been claimed by a fellow CBS affiliate in Nashville, Tennessee. At this point, Meredith chose WTVH as the new calls with "H" being a link to its WHEN-TV heritage. In June 1993, Meredith announced the sale of WTVH and sister station KSEE-TV in Fresno, California to Granite Broadcasting with the sale closing on December 23 of that year.

Granite soon increased its Northeastern holdings with the purchase of WKBW-TV in Buffalo in 1995 and WBNG-TV in Binghamton in July 2006. As part of the WBNG-TV purchase, Les Vann (formerly President and General Manager of WTVH) was promoted to Executive Vice President of Central and Southern New York operations with regional responsibilities at both WBNG-TV and WTVH. At the same time, Matthew Rosenfeld was promoted to Vice President and Station Manager of this channel after holding the General Sales Manager position since 2004.

In April 2008, Matthew Rosenfeld was appointed to the position of President and General Manager of WTVH and its Binghamton sister stations (WBNG and "WBXI"). On April 6, 2008, Jean Daugherty died at age 84. She was known to many baby boomer children as "The Play Lady" on this station's locally produced children's program, The Magic Toy Shop, from 1955 until 1982. Daugherty wrote more than 6,000 episodes of the program, which after ending its run, was the longest-running local children's show in the country.

On March 2, 2009, as a result of continual low ratings, slow advertising sales, and the loss of the Ithaca area to WENY-DT2, it was announced that WTVH would enter into a local marketing agreement with rivals WSTM-TV and WSTQ-LP. Initially, WTVH continued to operate out of its own facilities on James Street but eventually moved into WSTM-TV's studios a block away. WTVH's studios were put up for lease in Summer 2009 and were eventually sold after several years of vacancy to developer Lou Santaro in October 2016, who plans to convert the old studios into office space.

On September 6, 2009, its transmitter was damaged after a power failure. While Granite Broadcasting worked to fix the signal, WSTM-TV's third digital subchannel (normally a 24-hour local weather channel) carried WTVH. As of September 12, WTVH's signal was restored even though, as late as November 12, over-the-air viewers continued to experience breakup of the signal.

On February 28, 2013, Barrington Broadcasting announced the sale of its entire group, including WSTM-TV and WSTQ-LP, to Sinclair Broadcast Group. The existing LMA for WTVH was included in the deal; however, Granite retained ownership of WTVH's license assets. WSTM-TV planned to continue to operate the station until March 2016 (the agreement was earlier expected to last until March 2017 but the FCC later voted to outlaw all existing joint sales agreements by 2016). However, Sinclair continues to operate WTVH as of April 2016 pending legal action on the JSA regulations. The group deal also resulted in Sinclair selling its existing Syracuse market station (Fox affiliate WSYT, channel 68) and the LMA and purchase option for MyNetworkTV affiliate WNYS-TV (channel 43) to its sidecar company, Cunningham Broadcasting.

However, in an updated filing that August, Sinclair would instead sell WSYT and the LMA for WNYS-TV to Bristlecone Broadcasting, a company owned by Northwest Broadcasting owner Brian Brady. Sinclair continued to operate WSYT and WNYS-TV through a transitional services agreement for six months after the sale was consummated (until May 2014). With the sale of KSEE to the Nexstar Broadcasting Group in February 2013 and the announced sales of most of Granite's remaining stations to the E. W. Scripps Company and Quincy Newspapers in February 2014, along with the surrender of San Francisco independent station KOFY-TV's spectrum in the 2017 incentive auction, WTVH is the last remaining station whose license is owned by SP Granite. As of December 2021, well over five years after the local marketing agreement was set to expire, WTVH continues to be operated by Sinclair.

Other markets
From 1956, when CBS ended a secondary affiliation with WKTV after a dispute, to November 22, 2015, when WKTV affiliated its second digital subchannel with the network, WTVH served as the de facto affiliate for the majority of the Utica market, namely Herkimer County and that area's portion of Oneida County; the southern portion of the market (corresponding to Otsego County) was served by WBNG. WTVH was extremely protective of this status, barring current ABC affiliate WUTR from affiliating with CBS on at least one occasion. CBS also blocked a 1983 attempt by new station WTUV (now WFXV) to affiliate with the network, as it felt that its existing coverage in Utica (including carriage of WTVH on area cable systems) was sufficient (WTUV would sign on in 1986 as a Fox affiliate). Under Granite's ownership, WTVH did not take advantage of this status in terms of targeted advertising and news coverage focusing on the Utica area. Portions of that market lost access to WTVH's over-the-air broadcasts as a result of the 2009 digital television transition.

WTVH's schedule was carried in full on cable in Watertown due to its status as an out-of-market station that was "significantly viewed" over-the-air, even though the area has WWNY-TV as its own CBS affiliate. WWNY-TV's owner, United Communications, argued in a 2018 petition that WTVH's significantly-viewed status should be removed as it provides no over-the-air coverage to Watertown after the transition to digital. The FCC decided in United's favor, and WWNY-TV is now allowed to black out network and duplicate syndicated programming on WTVH's feed on local cable providers.

NFL/Buffalo Bills coverage issues
In 1997, CBS gained the rights to the American Football Conference of the National Football League. The league determined that portions of Yates County, a fairly narrow location only a few miles wide at certain points, was within  of Ralph Wilson Stadium, home of the Buffalo Bills. That area is on the far western fringe of the Syracuse market and has varied between the Syracuse and Rochester markets several times. Therefore, WTVH was formerly forced to black out Buffalo Bills games if they do not sell out before a 72-hour deadline prior to kickoff. Before the launch of WKTV-DT2's CBS subchannel, this also meant the blackout de facto extended into the Utica market for CBS games. Since the 2015 NFL season the league's blackout policy has been suspended on a season-to-season basis, allowing Bills home games to air on WTVH regardless of sell-out status. WTVH's status was different from the years NBC held the AFC package, where WSTM and WKTV were allowed to broadcast Bills home games regardless of sell-out status, mainly due to less finessed market boundary maps in the pre-digital age.

News operation

For most of its first 40 years on-air, WHEN-TV/WTVH was the dominant station in Central New York. However, it fell into gradual decline beginning in the 1980s which accelerated under subsequent owners, as the Meredith Corporation's other stations were in growth markets such as Phoenix and the relaxation of ownership restrictions saw investment in a station in a stagnant market decline. Ever since the mid-1990s, WTVH's newscasts struggled in the Nielsen ratings running a distant third behind rivals WSYR-TV and WSTM-TV. This precipitous decline in its local news viewership contributed to Meredith's decision to sell the station in 1993 (WTVH was battling WSTM-TV for second place behind WSYR-TV at the time of the sale), along with CBS's struggles through the decade causing declines throughout other parts of the day. Ratings plummeted even further after popular longtime anchor Ron Curtis retired in December 2000.

In 2000, WSTM-TV declined to renew its news share agreement with WSYT that featured a nightly, half-hour prime time newscast on the latter. As a result, WSYT partnered with WTVH to continue the broadcasts. Now known as Fox 68 Eyewitness News at 10, this effort was eventually joined by an hour-long weekday morning show called Fox 68 Eyewitness News at 7. Both of the programs featured the same branding as WTVH's newscasts did at the time. Meanwhile, in 2003, WSTM-TV brought back a nightly prime time show at 10 for its newly acquired sister station WSTQ-LP.

In April 2006, WTVH ceased producing all local news programming for WSYT in order to focus on its own newscasts that were cemented in third place by this point. Ironically, the nightly 10 o'clock broadcasts were WTVH's most successful having soundly beat WSTM-TV's effort on WSTQ-LP. WSYT is one of a few big four network-affiliated stations which do not have an internal news division.

On December 22, 2006, one of the area's most popular long-time journalists, Nancy Duffy, died after a long illness. Duffy began her television career at channel 5. Throughout her career, Duffy led the way for women in journalism. She became the first female police reporter in Central New York after joining the Syracuse Herald-Journal in 1966. She was Syracuse's first female television reporter when she moved to channel 5 in 1967. She became the first woman to join the Syracuse Press Club and later served as its president. In 1970, Duffy served as press secretary at Syracuse City Hall for then-mayor Lee Alexander. She returned to the station after a year and moved to what was then WNYS-TV as a reporter and weekday morning news anchor in 1977.

In 2007, the station fired Ron Curtis' longtime anchor desk partner, Maureen Green, a 22-year veteran of the station.

As a result of the LMA with WSTM, WTVH's news department was shut down and merged with the NBC outlet. This resulted in the elimination of 40 jobs at this station. Only Michael Benny was retained to solo-anchor the weeknight newscasts on WTVH from its separate studios (less than a block away on James Street from WSTM-TV's facility) using other personalities from WSTM-TV for all other content. The system set up by this CBS affiliate to use all videotaped footage (including interviews) shot by WSTM-TV was filled with problems with staffers from WSTM-TV actually walking to WTVH's old studios to deliver raw video to be edited for its weeknight news programs. Neither station attempted to offer newscasts outside traditional time slots to compete with WSYR-TV (such as weekdays at 11 a.m., 12:30 p.m., or weeknights at 4 and 7) despite a plan originally announced. WSYR-TV eventually expanded WSTQ-LP's weeknight prime time newscast to an hour on August 30, 2010.

In October 2009, Barrington Broadcasting began to produce separate weeknight newscasts on WTVH from a new secondary set at WSTM-TV's facility. Otherwise, at that time, the CBS and NBC stations would simulcast each other on weekday mornings (except the first hour at 4 a.m. on WSTM-TV), weekdays at noon, and weekend evenings. Although WTVH retained unique branding, music, and graphic aspects of the separately-produced news broadcasts on weeknights, coverage was essentially the same with re-purposed and packaged stories from the NBC affiliate airing on this CBS station. WSTM-TV usually featured more live reports from the field during a breaking news event.

In mid-December 2010, WSTM-TV became the first in the market to upgrade local news production to 16:9 enhanced definition widescreen and the shows on WTVH were included in the change. Although not truly high definition, the broadcasts match the aspect ratio of HD television screens. Rival WSYR-TV would switch to full high definition newscasts on January 29, 2011. On October 23, 2016, WSTM and WTVH became the second and third stations, respectively, to switch to their own true HD newscasts.

On April 13, 2015, WTVH reintroduced separately-produced local newscasts airing weekday mornings (from 5 to 7 a.m.) and weekdays at noon (seen for a half-hour) with a dedicated anchor and meteorologist that do not appear on WSTM-TV. At the same time, this station also began to feature its own meteorologist for the weeknight newscasts rather than sharing an on-air personality with WSTM-TV. WTVH already has a separate news anchor seen weeknights exclusively on the station. WTVH continues to simulcast local news with WSTM-TV on weekend evenings. These broadcasts use the two station's shared branding, CNY Central. There can be a preemption or delay on one channel due to network obligations (most notably sports programming).

Notable former on-air staff
Lee Goldberg – weather anchor (1993-1996, now chief weather anchor at WABC-TV in New York City)
Don Morrow – program host and voice over announcer/pioneering newscaster (1948–1949)
David Muir – news anchor (mid-late 1990s, now anchor of ABC World News Tonight)
Al Roker – weekend weather anchor (1974–1976, now weather and feature reporter for Today)
Mike Tirico – sports director (late 1980s–early 1990s, later ESPN's Monday Night Football play-by-play announcer, now at NBC Sports)
Adam Zucker – sports anchor and reporter (1998–1999, now a studio host for CBS Sports)

Technical information

Subchannels
The station's digital signal is multiplexed:

Analog-to-digital conversion
WTVH shut down its analog signal, over VHF channel 5, on June 12, 2009, the official date in which full-power television in the United States transitioned from analog to digital broadcasts under federal mandate. The station's digital signal remained on its pre-transition UHF channel 47. Through the use of PSIP, digital television receivers display the station's virtual channel as its former VHF analog channel 5. In January 2015, WTVH's second digital subchannel began carrying the Grit network. On February 13, 2017, WTVH's third digital subchannel began carrying Sinclair's TBD network.

Grit was removed from WTVH-DT2 on February 28, 2017, and replaced by Charge!, another Sinclair-owned network.

References

External links
WTVH "CBS 5"

Television channels and stations established in 1948
TVH
CBS network affiliates
Charge! (TV network) affiliates
TBD (TV network) affiliates
Sinclair Broadcast Group
1948 establishments in New York (state)
Former Meredith Corporation subsidiaries